Federico Delbonis was the defending champion but chose not to defend his title.

Tomás Martín Etcheverry won the title after defeating Vitaliy Sachko 7–5, 6–2 in the final.

Seeds

Draw

Finals

Top half

Bottom half

References

External links
Main draw
Qualifying draw

Internazionali di Tennis Città di Perugia - 1
2021 Singles